Mats Bernhard Kihlström (born January 3, 1964 in Ludvika) is an ice hockey player who played for the Swedish national team. He won a bronze medal at the 1988 Winter Olympics. He played for Södertälje SK and Brynäs IF throughout his career and he played 147 matches for the Swedish national team he won a silver medal at the 1986 World Championships.

Career statistics

Regular season and playoffs

International

References 

1964 births
Living people
Ice hockey players at the 1988 Winter Olympics
Olympic bronze medalists for Sweden
Olympic ice hockey players of Sweden
Olympic medalists in ice hockey
Södertälje SK players
Brynäs IF players
Medalists at the 1988 Winter Olympics
Calgary Flames draft picks